Gilmak Queiroz da Silva, commonly known as Gilmak, (born December 2, 1986 in Horizonte, Brazil) is a Brazilian footballer currently playing for the Brazilian football club Botafogo-SP.

He made his debut for Fredrikstad FK as a substitute against Strømmen IF August 8, 2010.

External links 
 Player profile at ffksupporter.net 
 Player details

1986 births
Living people
Brazilian footballers
Association football midfielders
Esporte Clube Noroeste players
Fortaleza Esporte Clube players
Fredrikstad FK players
Botafogo Futebol Clube (SP) players
Norwegian First Division players
Brazilian expatriate footballers
Brazilian expatriate sportspeople in Norway
Expatriate footballers in Norway